Jeremiah Noel Lucey (1939 – 19 July 2021) was an Irish Gaelic footballer. He played at club level with Glenbeigh-Glencar, Laune Rangers and Mid Kerry and at inter-county level with the Kerry senior football team.

Career

Born in Caragh Lake, County Kerry, Lucey first played Gaelic football with Glenbeigh-Glencar before transferring to the Laune Rangers club. He won a County Championship title with divisional side Mid Kerry in 1967. Having never played at minor inter-county level, Lucey first was included on the Kerry senior football team during a number of tournament games in early 1962. He ended the season with an All-Ireland Championship title after lining out at centre-back in the final defeat of Roscommon. His brother, Jimmy Lucey, also lined out that day, while a third brother, Vincent Lucey, played in the 1965 All-Ireland final defeat by Galway. Lucey's inter-county career ended after just two seasons, by which stage he had also secured a National League title.

Death

Lucey died in Glenflesk, County Kerry on 19 July 2021.

Career statistics

Honours

Mid Kerry
Kerry Senior Football Championship: 1967

Kerry
All-Ireland Senior Football Championship: 1962
Munster Senior Football Championship: 1962
National Football League: 1962-63

References

1939 births
2021 deaths
Glenbeigh-Glencar Gaelic footballers
Laune Rangers Gaelic footballers
Kerry inter-county Gaelic footballers